Danielle Marie Johnson (born November 17, 1987) is an American soccer defender who played for the Vancouver Whitecaps FC. She had previously played for the Melbourne Victory and the Atlanta Beat. She previously attended the University of Mississippi. In January 2012, Johnson signed with Atlanta Beat. Head coach James Galanis said of Johnson, "She is strong and fearless, and she also has good ball handling skills."

References

1987 births
Living people
Melbourne Victory FC (A-League Women) players
Ole Miss Rebels women's soccer players
NJ/NY Gotham FC players
Atlanta Beat (WPS) players
Sportspeople from Baton Rouge, Louisiana
American women's soccer players
Women's association football defenders
Soccer players from Louisiana
American expatriate sportspeople in Canada
American expatriate sportspeople in Australia
Expatriate women's soccer players in Canada
Expatriate women's soccer players in Australia
American expatriate women's soccer players
Women's Professional Soccer players